Andreas Kleerup (born 1979), professionally known as Kleerup, is a Swedish electropop musician.

Career
Kleerup's career as a  producer, composer, songwriter and artist began in music as a songwriter, going on to tour with Teddybears and Robyn as a musician. In 2007, Kleerup released "With Every Heartbeat" featuring Robyn, which reached No. 1 in the UK. The song appeared on top 10 lists in several countries in Europe and became a top 30 single on the Billboard Hot 100 in the USA.

Kleerup's debut album, Kleerup, was released in 2008. The album and Kleerup received six Grammy nominations and won in three categories: "Best Newcomer", "Best Producer", and "Best Composer". Among the collaborating artists on the album are Lykke Li, Robyn, and Neneh Cherry. The mini-album, As If We Never Won, followed in 2014.

The 2010s also saw Kleerup expand his career as a composer. In 2010, he and Carl Bagge composed the music for Stockholm City Theatre's 50th-anniversary performance, a musical adaptation of Nobel Prize laureate Harry Martinson's Aniara, performed by a double string quartet.

In 2010, NME name Kleerup one of the 20 hottest producers in music.

In September 2014, Kleerup announced the first of two mini-LPs, As If We Never Won, and shared credit of the song "Let Me In" with Susanne Sundfør. H&M used the track for their Fall Fashion 2014 advertising campaign in cinema, TV, and Online.

In addition to his work as a composer and songwriter, Kleerup has worked with and remixed such iconic artists as Lady Gaga, Moby, The Cardigans, and Nonono.

In March 2020, Kleerup released his latest album, 2.

Personal life 
Kleerup is married. He has one child from an earlier relationship.

Kleerup was diagnosed with attention deficit hyperactivity disorder and Tourette syndrome in 2007. He has also struggled with depression for long periods of his life and made a suicide attempt in 2009.

Discography

Albums

EPs

Singles

1Not officially released as a single, but charted due to extensive downloading.

References

External links

 
 Interview with Kleerup at Bloginity

1979 births
Living people
Musicians from Stockholm
Swedish electronic musicians
Swedish entertainers
Swedish record producers
Swedish songwriters
People with Tourette syndrome